This is a list of area codes in the province of Ontario:

226: London, Kitchener–Waterloo, Windsor, and most of Southwestern Ontario; overlays with 519 and 548
249: Most of Northeastern and Central Ontario; overlays 705 
289: Niagara Region, Hamilton, Halton Region, Peel Region, York Region and Durham Region; overlays with 905 and  365
343: Ottawa and surrounding Eastern Ontario; overlays with 613
365: Niagara Region, Hamilton, Halton Region, Peel Region, York Region and Durham Region; overlays with 905 and  289
416: Toronto; overlays with 647 and 437
437: Toronto; overlays with 647 and 416
519: London, Kitchener–Waterloo, Windsor, and most of Southwestern Ontario; overlays with 226 and 548
548: London, Kitchener–Waterloo, Windsor, and most of Southwestern Ontario; overlays with 519 and 226
613: Ottawa and surrounding Eastern Ontario; overlays with 343
647: Toronto; overlays with 416 and 437
705: Most of Northeastern and Central Ontario; overlays with 249
807: Most of Northwestern Ontario
905: Niagara Region, Hamilton, Halton Region, Peel Region, York Region and Durham Region; overlays with 289 and  365

References

See also 

 Telephone numbers in Canada
 Canadian Numbering Administration Consortium

Ontario
Area codes
Area codes